The Ice Harvest is the debut novel of Scott Phillips. The story, set in 1979, was published to wide acclaim in 2000.

Critical reception
Publishers Weekly called the book a "darkly delicious debut comic thriller." The New York Times called it "bitterly funny," writing that the crime genre "has found a sterling new champion in Phillips."

Awards and nominations
 Silver Medal - First Work of Fiction, by the California Book Awards (for books published in 2000).
 It was shortlisted for the CWA Gold Dagger for best crime novel of 2001.

Film, TV or theatrical adaptations
It was adapted into a film of the same name in 2005.

Release details

References

2000 American novels
American crime novels
Fiction set in 1979
Novels set in the 1970s
Novels set in Kansas
Culture of Wichita, Kansas
American novels adapted into films
Ballantine Books books
2000 debut novels